Breidablik Peak is a mountain on Baffin Island, located  northeast of Pangnirtung, Nunavut, Canada. It lies in the southern Baffin Mountains which in turn form part of the Arctic Cordillera mountain system. Like Mounts Odin and Asgard and other peaks in the Arctic Cordillera, its name comes from Norse mythology. It is named after Breidablik, the home of Baldr.

References

Arctic Cordillera
One-thousanders of Nunavut